, also known by Prince , was a royal of the Ryukyu Kingdom. He was the third head of a royal family, Oroku Udun, and was also father of King Shō Nei.

Shō I was a grandson of Urasoe Chōman (Shō Ikō), the deposed crown prince of King Shō Shin. His father was Urasoe Chōkyō. Urasoe Chōshi was one of his younger brother.

Shō I had two famous sons: the eldest son was King Shō Nei, the second son was Gushichan Chōsei. He died in 1584, and buried in Urasoe yōdore.

Shō I was posthumously honored as king in 1699, and his spirit tablet was placed in Sōgen-ji. His title was stripped in 1719, and his spirit tablet was moved to Tenkai-ji.

References

Second Shō dynasty
Princes of Ryūkyū
People of the Ryukyu Kingdom
1584 deaths